Allen Harold Bourbeau  (born May 17, 1965) is an American former ice hockey player. He played for Acton Boxborough HS in Mass and was the leading scorer in Mass HS hockey at the time of his graduation. He went on to star at Harvard University. He was selected by the Philadelphia Flyers in the 4th round (81st overall) of the 1983 NHL Entry Draft.

Bourbeau played with Team USA at the 1988 Winter Olympics.

Awards and honors

Career statistics

Regular season and playoffs

International

References

External links

1965 births
American men's ice hockey centers
Harvard Crimson men's ice hockey players
Ice hockey people from Worcester, Massachusetts
Ice hockey players at the 1988 Winter Olympics
Living people
Olympic ice hockey players of the United States
Philadelphia Flyers draft picks
NCAA men's ice hockey national champions